İkizler can refer to:

 İkizler, İnebolu
 İkizler, Tercan